The 1977 Benson & Hedges Ireland Tournament was the third edition of the professional invitational snooker tournament and took place in February 1977. For the second year running the tournament featured four professional players, although defending champion John Spencer did not compete this year and was replaced by Ray Reardon. The prize fund for the winner this year was £750, up from £600 the previous year.

In a format tweak to the previous year, the four players competed in a group format, with the top two winning the most frames advancing to the final. Higgins earned £100 for the tournament high break - 126 in his group match with Taylor. Reardon topped the group, with Higgins and Taylor tied for second. In a one-frame shoot-out, Higgins defeated Taylor 71-57 and advanced to the final, in which he defeated Reardon 5–3.

Main draw

Group stage

 Alex Higgins 4–1 Dennis Taylor
 Ray Reardon 4–1 Graham Miles
 Dennis Taylor 3–2 Graham Miles
 Ray Reardon 4–1 Alex Higgins
 Graham Miles 3–2 Alex Higgins
 Dennis Taylor 3–2 Ray Reardon

Group playoff
 Alex Higgins 71–57 Dennis Taylor  (one-frame shoot-out)

Final
 Alex Higgins 5–3 Ray Reardon

References

Irish Masters
Irish Masters
Irish Masters
Irish Masters